Dark Net is an American documentary television series created by Mati Kochavi that explores the dark web and technology, and themes such as biohacking, cyber-kidnapping, digital warfare, online cults, pornography addiction, and webcam strippers. The series premiered on January 21, 2016, on Showtime, with the first season consisting of eight episodes. Its second season, consisting of eight episodes, premiered  on April 6, 2017.

Production
Showtime greenlit the series in November 2015. It was created by Mati Kochavi, the founder of Vocativ, and is co-produced by Part2 Pictures. The series was renewed for a second season in March 2016.

Reception
The series has received generally positive reviews from critics. On Metacritic, it has a score of 69 out of 100 based on six reviews. Keith Uhlich of The Hollywood Reporter gave it a positive review, calling it "compelling" and wrote, "Contemplation and condemnation, all wrapped up into one, with no easy answers at the end of it all. The fact that Dark Net never allows you to entirely pin down its perspective keeps the proceedings riveting." Brian Lowry of Variety gave it a more mixed review and wrote, "Other than acknowledging that these subcultures exist, what Dark Net doesn't do is shed much light on them."

International broadcast
The series premiered in Canada on The Movie Network on January 21, 2016, simultaneous with the American broadcast.

Episodes

Series overview

Season 1 (2016)

Season 2 (2017)

References

External links
 
 

2010s American documentary television series
2016 American television series debuts
2017 American television series endings
Dark web
Cyborgs in television
Showtime (TV network) original programming